Shadow People (previously known as The Door) is a 2013 American supernatural horror thriller film written and directed by Matthew Arnold in his feature directorial debut. It stars Dallas Roberts, Alison Eastwood, Anne Dudek, and Mattie Liptak.

Plot 
The film begins with a series of videos posted to YouTube, with users of the website relating their experiences with unexplained sightings. Later, radio talk show host Charlie Crowe (Dallas Roberts) becomes convinced that mysterious nocturnal entities known as shadow people are responsible for a spate of deaths in his hometown. He is joined by CDC investigator Sophie Lacombe (Alison Eastwood), who seeks a more rational explanation.

Cast 
 Dallas Roberts as Charlie Crowe
 Alison Eastwood as Sophie Lacombe
 Anne Dudek as Ellen Camfield
 Mattie Liptak as Preston Camfield
 Mariah Bonner as Maggie Dunn
 Christopher Berry as Tom  DiMartino
 Jonathan Baron as Jeff Pyatt
 Tony Schiena as Robert
 Richie Montgomery as Jim "Sparky" Taylor
 Raeden Greer as Britney Daniels
 Gary Grubbs as James Gering, CDC Director
 Bryan Massey as Bill Ryder
 Marco St. John as Professor Norman Fisher
 Jaqueline Fleming as Nurse Marian Sobel
 Billy Slaughter as TV Anchor

Production 
Shadow People was filmed in Baton Rouge, Louisiana, and Phnom Penh, Cambodia.

The film mixes dramatic scenes with both real and simulated archival footage. The simulated footage includes interviews with the characters from the dramatic scenes, while the actual footage incorporates segments from the 2008 web documentary Your Worst Nightmare.

The movie is dedicated to victims of Sudden Unexplained Nocturnal Death Syndrome (SUNDS).

Release 
The film made its Marché du Film premiere during the 2012 Cannes Film Festival. It was released on DVD and Blu-ray on March 19, 2013.

Reception 
Matt Molgaard of Best Horror Movies wrote, "This is a stirring flick, and in truth, I’d be holding back if I called Shadow People anything other than an outstanding success that far exceeded expectations... Shadow People has already established itself as one of 2013’s most inspired efforts." David Maine of PopMatters wrote, "Shadow People is a spooky little movie that could have been much spookier, but still makes good use of its limited means to convey an unsettling story."  Ain't It Cool News declared that "it made me think twice about turning on the light as I went to bed. Any film that does that is a winner in my book." Brad McHargue of Dread Central rated the film 1.5 out of 5 stars and called the film "novel and ambitious" but too messy to fulfill the potential of the premise. Pat Torfe of Bloody Disgusting rated the film 2.5 out of 5 stars, writing that Shadow People lacks balance and "doesn't know what it is." Thomas Marcum of The Crypto Crew said "the movie is well done all the way around and well worth watching".

References

External links 
 

2013 films
2013 direct-to-video films
2013 directorial debut films
2013 horror films
2013 thriller films
2013 horror thriller films
2010s supernatural horror films
2010s supernatural thriller films
American direct-to-video films
American horror thriller films
American supernatural horror films
American supernatural thriller films
Direct-to-video horror films
Direct-to-video thriller films
Films set in Cambodia
Films set in Kentucky
Films shot in Cambodia
Films shot in Louisiana
2010s English-language films
2010s American films